The  New Orleans VooDoo season was the third season for the franchise in the Arena Football League. They returned from hiatus in 2006 due to Hurricane Katrina. They went 5-11 and missed the playoffs.

Schedule

Coaching
Mike Neu started his third season as head coach of the VooDoo.

Personnel moves

Acquired

Departures

2007 roster

Stats

Offense

Quarterback

Running backs

Wide receivers

Touchdowns

Defense

Special teams

Kick return

Kicking

External links

New Orleans VooDoo
New Orleans VooDoo seasons
New Orleans VooDoo